2009 in Bellator MMA was the first installment of the Bellator Fighting Championships (Bellator FC)-produced series. It started broadcasting April 3, 2009, through an exclusive television agreement with ESPN Deportes. The episodes had a one-day tape delay.

Bellator 1

Bellator 1 was a mixed martial arts event by Bellator Fighting Championships. The event took place on Friday, April 3, 2009 at the Seminole Hard Rock Hotel & Casino in Hollywood, Florida. It was broadcast nationally in the U.S. via tape-delay the following night on Saturday, April 4, 2009 through an exclusive television agreement with ESPN Deportes.

The event featured quarter-final tournament bouts of the 2009 Featherweight (145 lb) and Lightweight (155 lb) Tournaments, along with a number of non-tournament bouts to be held in the organization's other weight divisions. All bouts were contested under the Unified Rules of Mixed Martial Arts.

Results

Bellator 2

Bellator 2 was a mixed martial arts event by the promotion Bellator Fighting Championships. The event took place on Friday, April 10, 2009 at the Mohegan Sun in Uncasville, Connecticut. It was then broadcast nationally in the U.S. via tape-delay the following night on Saturday, April 11, 2009 through an exclusive television agreement with ESPN Deportes.

Background

The event featured the final quarter-final bouts of the 2009 Featherweight (145 lb) and Lightweight (155 lb) Tournaments, as well as, the quarter-final round of the Welterweight (170 lb) Tournament. A number of non-tournament bouts to be held in the organization's other weight divisions also took place. The evening's main event saw undefeated Henry Martinez square off against rising star Wilson Reis.<ref name="Wilson Reis to headline second Bellator event at Mohegan Sun on April 10">{{cite web| url=http://mmamania.com/2009/03/06/wilson-reis-to-headline-second-bellator-event-at-mohegan-sun-on-april-10/#more-11409| title="Wilson Reis to headline second Bellator event at Mohegan Sun on April 10" | date=6 March 2009| access-date=2009-03-06| publisher=MMAmania.com}}</ref> All bouts were contested under the Unified Rules of Mixed Martial Arts.

Results

 Bellator 3 Bellator 3 and Bellator IV were two episodes of the  mixed martial arts promotion, Bellator Fighting Championships, created from a single event. The event took place on Friday, April 17, 2009 at the Lloyd Noble Center in Norman, Oklahoma.

BackgroundBellator IV was originally scheduled for Montreal, however regulatory issues prevented the event from being held there.  Each episode featured half of the bouts from the third Bellator event.  Bellator III aired nationally in the U.S. via tape-delay the following night on Saturday, April 18, 2009 through an exclusive television agreement with ESPN Deportes.  Bellator IV aired on Saturday, April 25, 2009.

Results

Bellator 4

Results

Bellator 5Bellator 5 took place on Friday, May 1, 2009 in Dayton, Ohio. It was broadcast nationally in the U.S. via tape-delay the following night on Saturday, May 2, 2009 through an exclusive television agreement with ESPN Deportes.

Background

The event featured the semi-finals of the Lightweight Tournament.

Debuting for the promotion were heavyweight prospect Dave Herman and former UFC fighter Dan Evensen.

All bouts were contested under the Unified Rules of Mixed Martial Arts.

Results

Bellator 6Bellator 6 was an event of the mixed martial arts promotion, Bellator Fighting Championships. The event took place on Friday, May 8, 2009 in Robstown, Texas. It was broadcast nationally in the U.S. via tape-delay the following night on Saturday, May 9, 2009 through an exclusive television agreement with ESPN Deportes.

Background

The event featured the semi-finals of the Featherweight Tournament.

All bouts were contested under the Unified Rules of Mixed Martial Arts.

Results

Bellator 7/8Bellator 7/8 was an event of the mixed martial arts promotion, Bellator Fighting Championships. The events took place on Friday, May 15, 2009 in Chicago, Illinois. It was broadcast nationally in the U.S. via tape-delay the following night on Saturday, May 16, 2009 through an exclusive television agreement with ESPN Deportes.

Background

The events featured the semi-finals of the Welterweight Tournament.

The card also featured the debut of former UFC heavyweight Eddie Sanchez.

All bouts were contested under the Unified Rules of Mixed Martial Arts.

Results

Bellator 8
There were no fights scheduled for week 8. Instead, Bellator ran a "Road to the Championship" special highlighting tournament fights.  This highlight show was considered Bellator 8.

Bellator 9Bellator 9 was a mixed martial arts event promoted by Bellator Fighting Championships. The event took place on Friday, May 29, 2009 in Monroe, Louisiana. It was broadcast nationally in the U.S. via tape-delay the following night on Saturday, May 30, 2009 through an exclusive television agreement with ESPN Deportes.

Results

Bellator 10Bellator 10 was a mixed martial arts event promoted by Bellator Fighting Championships. The event took place on Friday, June 5, 2009 in Ontario, California at the Citizens Business Bank Arena. It was broadcast nationally in the U.S. via tape-delay the following night on Saturday, June 6, 2009 through an exclusive television agreement with ESPN Deportes.

Background

The show featured the finals of the Featherweight tournament.

Results

Bellator 11Bellator 11 was a mixed martial arts event promoted by Bellator Fighting Championships. The event took place on Friday, June 12, 2009 in Uncasville, Connecticut at the Mohegan Sun Arena. It broadcast nationally in the U.S. via tape-delay the following night on Saturday, June 13, 2009 through an exclusive television agreement with ESPN Deportes.

Background

This event featured the finals of the Bellator Welterweight Grand Prix.

Results

Bellator 12Bellator 12'' was a mixed martial arts event by Bellator Fighting Championships. The event took place on Friday, June 19, 2009 at the Seminole Hard Rock Hotel & Casino in Hollywood, Florida. It was broadcast nationally in the U.S. via tape-delay the following night on Saturday, June 20, 2009 through an exclusive television agreement with ESPN Deportes.

Background

The event featured the final tournament bouts of the 2009 Season One Lightweight (155 lb) and Middleweight (185 lb) Tournaments, along with a number of non-tournament bouts held in the organization's other weight divisions.

All bouts were contested under the Unified Rules of Mixed Martial Arts.

Results

Tournaments

Middleweight Tournament Bracket

Welterweight Tournament Bracket

Lightweight Tournament Bracket

Featherweight Tournament Bracket

External links
Bellator
New Mixed Martial Arts League, Led by Industry Veterans
Bellator Fighting Championships signs top lightweight Eddie Alvarez
Nine reasons to be excited about MMA in 2009
MMA coming to ESPN Deportes
Schulte Announced by Bellator

References

2009 American television seasons
2009 in mixed martial arts
Bellator MMA events
Mixed martial arts in the United States